Zay Thiha is a Burmese business tycoon and vice chairman of Zaykabar Construction, one of the country's largest construction companies. He is also the chairman of the World Lethwei Championship, and president of the Myanmar Archery Federation,  the governing body of archery in Myanmar. He is the eldest son and heir of Khin Shwe, one of Myanmar's richest men and founder of the Zaykabar Company. In the aftermath of the 2021 Myanmar coup d'état, he was arrested and sent to Insein Prison on 23 March 2021 along with his father, following a conflict over a failed building development on military-owned land in Yangon. They are became the first major cronies to be arrested after the coup. He is married to Nandar Hlaing, a popular actress, in 2008, and has three children.

References

Living people
Burmese businesspeople
Year of birth missing (living people)